The City Arsenal is the oldest of three historic arsenal buildings in Lviv, Ukraine. The other two are the Royal Arsenal and Sieniawski Arsenal. It is a rectangular two-storey structure with a miniature octagonal tower on the north side. The building, in its present shape, was erected in 1554–56 above a 14th-century structure of unknown function. It was formerly attached to the city walls and featured a torture chamber. The arsenal building was blown up by the Swedes during the Great Northern War but was subsequently restored. At present it houses an armoury museum.

References

External links
 

Museums in Lviv
Military and war museums in Ukraine
Arsenals
1706 establishments in Ukraine
Lviv Arsenal Museum website (with detailed exposition description in English)